The Albanians in Austria refers to the Albanian migrants in Austria and their descendants. They mostly trace their origins to Kosovo, North Macedonia and to a lesser extent to Albania and other Albanian-speaking territories in the Balkan Peninsula.

History 
At the end of the 14th century Ottoman troops reached Albanian settlement areas for the first time. On March 2, 1444, the Albanian Prince Gjergj Kastrioti, better known as Skanderbeg, founded the League of Lezhë. This defensive alliance brought the Ottoman Empire to the brink of collapse on several occasions and was able to hold back the further expansion of the Islamic theocracy for 35 years. The military successes of Skanderbeg made him during his lifetime the Athleta Christi, the symbol of the defense of Christianity. After the death of Skanderbeg, the last Albanian fortress fell in 1479 with Shkodra, and Albania fell under Turkish rule for over 400 years. However, the Albanian resistance continued unabated: Until the independence of Albania in 1912, 34 major rebellions of the Albanians took place against the Ottomans, which often supported Austria financially and militarily.

Giorgio Basta came from an Albanian noble family and was commander-in-chief of the Habsburg imperial army during the Long Turk war. Archduke Ferdinand II, son of the Austrian Emperor Ferdinand I, saw himself as the successor of Skanderbeg. The Habsburgs had also fought successfully in the Turkish wars against the Ottomans. He also brought the helmet and the sword Skanderbeg, which are still in Vienna today. The Great Turkish War, which included Albanian rebels, ended in defeat for the Ottomans. This victory laid the foundation for the rise of Austria to become a great power and marked the beginning of the period of military decline for the Ottoman Empire.
 
In Austria, there were 24,445 Kosovar citizens in 2017 and 31,809 Kosovars born in Kosovo.
The number of Albanians from North Macedonia is estimated at around 2,000. 
In Austria, there were 2,378 people of Albanian nationality living in 2017 and 3,861 persons born in Albania.

Since 15 December 2010, Albanian nationals have been able to enter Austria without visa for tourism or business purposes for a period of up to 90 days per half-year. The prerequisite is that they travel with a biometric passport. Border authorities may require Albanian nationals to provide proof of funding for their stay, travel expenses and travel purpose.

Asylum applications from Albanian citizens have varied widely in recent years, falling from 68 (2009) to 17 in one year (2010 and 2011). More than ten positive asylum decisions per year were issued only twice during this period, most recently in 2010. There is a clear increase in negative asylum decisions: From 2008 (23) to 2010 (86), there was almost a fourfold increase in negative asylum decisions. In 2011, there were 76. In the same year, four persons received subsidiary protection.

Demography

Population 

The distribution of Albanians with citizenship from Albania and Kosovo in Austria as of 1 January 2019:

The distribution of Albanians born in the countries of Albania and Kosovo living in Austria as of 1 January 2019:

Notable people

Science
 Alessandro Goracuchi – Albanian scientist, doctor and diplomat

Military
 Giorgio Basta  -  Italian general, diplomat, and writer of Arbëreshë origin, employed by the Holy Roman Emperor Rudolf II to command Habsburg forces in the Long War of 1591–1606

Arts
 Carl Ritter von Ghega  -   Albanian-Austrian nobleman and the designer of the Semmering Railway from Gloggnitz to Mürzzuschlag

Cinema
 Aleksandër Moisiu  -   Austrian stage actor

Sports
 Eldis Bajrami  -   Footballer 
 Sinan Bytyqi  -   retired Kosovo Albanian professional footballer 
 Ronald Gërçaliu  -   Albanian-born Austrian footballer
 Besian Idrizaj  -   was an Austrian professional footballer who last played as a striker for Swansea City
 Dukagjin Karanezi  -   Austrian–Albanian professional footballer
 Floralba Krasniqi  -   Albanian football midfielder
 Atdhe Nuhiu  -    Austrian–Albanian professional footballer
 Lumbardh Salihu  -    professional footballer
 Benjamin Sulimani  -    Austrian footballer
 Emin Sulimani  -   Austrian football midfielder
 Albert Vallci  -   Austrian footballer
 Vesel Demaku  -   Austrian-Albanian footballer
 Albin Gashi  -   Austrian-Albanian footballer
 Ylli Sallahi  -   Austrian footballer
 Adrian Hajdari  -   footballer
 Esad Bejic  -   footballer
 Dijon Kameri  -   footballer

See also  
Albania–Austria relations
Immigration to Austria
Albanian diaspora
Albanians in Germany
Albanians in Switzerland

Notes

References 

  
Ethnic groups in Austria
Immigration to Austria 
Austria
 
 
Albania–Austria relations
Austria–Kosovo relations